The 1962–63 season was Blackpool F.C.'s 55th season (52nd consecutive) in the Football League. They competed in the 22-team Division One, then the top tier of English football, finishing thirteenth for the second consecutive season.

Ray Charnley was the club's top scorer for the fifth consecutive season, with 22 goals.

Blackpool's FA Cup third round tie with Norwich City was postponed eleven times before finally being played at Carrow Road on 4 March.

Table

Notes

References

Blackpool F.C.
Blackpool F.C. seasons